Ptychobela opisthochetos is a species of sea snail, a marine gastropod mollusk in the family Pseudomelatomidae, the turrids and allies.

Description
The length of the shell varies between 18 mm and 30 mm.

Distribution
This species occurs in the Indian Ocean between Mozambique and the Gulf of Oman.

References

 Kilburn, R.N., 1989. Notes on Ptychobela and Brachytoma, with the description of a new species from Mozambique (Mollusca: Gastropoda: Turridae). Annals of the Natal Museum 30: 185-196

External links
 
 Gastropods.com: Ptychobela opisthochetos

opisthochetos
Gastropods described in 1989